In graph theory, a b-coloring of a graph is a coloring of the vertices where each color class contains a vertex that has a neighbor in all other color classes.

The b-chromatic number of a G graph is the largest b(G) positive integer that the G graph has a b-coloring with b(G) number of colors.

Victor Campos, Carlos Lima és Ana Silva used the relation between b-coloring and a graph's smallest cycle to partly prove the Erdős–Faber–Lovász conjecture.

References

Graph coloring